Kim Niklas Jones  (born 11 September 1979) is an English fashion designer. He is a graduate of Central St Martins College of Art and Design.

Early life and education

Born in London, Jones spent his childhood in Ecuador, the Caribbean, and Africa, following his father's job as a hydrologist.

Jones studied graphics and photography at Camberwell School of Art before enrolling in the MA Fashion course at Central Saint Martins, studying menswear. He graduated in 2002.

Career

Kim Jones, 2003–2008
Jones launched his eponymous brand in 2003, and in 2005 showed as part of the first season of MAN in conjunction with Fashion East, showcasing a short fashion film. Other presentations have varied from films with Alasdair McLellen and Toyin, to a book with American art photographer Luke Smalley.

Alongside his own brand, he collaborated or worked with a wide range of other brands during this period, including Hugo Boss, Topman, Umbro, Mulberry, Iceberg, and Kanye West's Pastelle, before being appointed as Creative Director for British men's luxury-goods brand Alfred Dunhill in 2008. After joining Dunhill, he closed his own brand.

Louis Vuitton, 2011–2018
In 2011, Jones was named the new style director of the men's ready-to-wear division at Louis Vuitton, replacing Paul Helbers, who had held the position for five years. During his time at the label, he helped develop a hit collaboration in 2017 with skatewear brand Supreme on a collection of branded hoodies, bags and other goods.

On 17 January 2018, it was announced that Jones would be leaving Vuitton as men's artistic director, after showing his final collection, A/W18, the following day.

Dior, 2018–present
On 19 March 2018, Jones was announced as creative director of Dior Homme, replacing Kris Van Assche. Prior to his first Dior Homme show, it was confirmed that he had designed the morning suit worn by David Beckham at the wedding of Prince Harry and Meghan Markle on 19 May 2018. Jones debuted his first collection for Dior Homme in June 2018 at Men's Fashion Week in Paris.

In May 2019, Jones revealed concept sketches for South Korean artists, BTS, announcing that Dior would be in charge of designing custom-made tour outfits, ahead of the band's Love Yourself World Tour. With the help of other creative directors such as Matthew Williams and Yoon Ahn (Dior's jewellery director) they incorporated Dior's iconic feminine, floral designs with industrial-like harnesses and chains.

Jones has been assisted for some 15 years by fellow Brit designer Lucy Beeden, who is currently Dior Men's Design Director.

Fendi, 2020–present
In September, 2020 Jones was announced as also taking the role of Artistic Director of Fendi's women's collection, formerly occupied by Karl Lagerfeld.

Other projects
Jones has contributed both as stylist and art director for magazines including Dazed & Confused, Arena Homme +, Another Magazine, the New York Times T Style magazine, 10 Men, V Man, i-D magazine, Numero Homme, and Fantastic Man. He has also contributed womenswear styling for V and POP magazines.

 'Umbro by Kim Jones', photographed by Alasdair McLellan, self-published, 2006
 Short film ‘Everywhere’ with Alasdair McLellan, for London Fashion Week February 2006
 Short film ‘Poplife’ with Will Davidson, for showstudio.com Spring/Summer 2006
 A womenswear collection for Isetan Tokyo 120th anniversary alongside Visionaire and Comme des Garçons
 Exhibition at the Museum of London, "The London Look – fashion from the street to catwalk," October 
 ‘Kim Jones’ by Luke Smalley, published by Twin Palms, 2004
 Short film with Toyin for the launch of the Autumn/Winter 2003 collection edited by Andrew Daffy
 Short film, "Raphi" with Toyin, for showstudio.com

Awards and honours
 2021 British Fashion Awards - FOR DIOR MEN AND FENDI
 2009 British Fashion Awards - Menswear Designer Of The Year, Kim Jones for Dunhill.
 2006 British Fashion Awards - Menswear Designer Of The Year
 Topshop New Generation Award, twice winner
 Dazed and Confused/Egg Bursary
 GQ Magazine – 3 nominations for "Man Of The Year" Awards two years running
 Elle Style Awards – 3 nominations
 Arena magazine- menswear design award nominee
 2019 British Fashion Awards - Menswear Designer Of The Year

Jones was appointed Officer of the Order of the British Empire (OBE) in the 2020 Birthday Honours for services to fashion.

Personal life
Jones lives in London, in a house designed by the Italian architect Gianni Botsford.

References

External links

Living people
1979 births
English designers
Menswear designers
Officers of the Order of the British Empire